John Devaney may refer to:

 John Devaney (businessman) (1946–2018), British businessman
 John P. Devaney (1883–1941), Chief Justice of the Minnesota Supreme Court
 John Devaney (ice hockey) (born 1958), Canadian ice hockey player
 John P. Devaney (fireboat), an FDNY fireboat named in honor of a firefighter who died on the job

Devaney, John